The Valentine Girl is a 1917 American silent romantic drama film directed by J. Searle Dawley and distributed by Paramount Pictures. The film starred Marguerite Clark, Frank Losee, and Richard Barthelmess. Actress Laura Sawyer wrote the screen story. The film is now presumed lost.

Cast
 Marguerite Clark as Marion Morgan
 Frank Losee as John Morgan
 Richard Barthelmess as Robert Wentworth
 Kathryn Adams as Lucille Haines
 Maggie Fisher as Mrs. Haines
 Adolphe Menjou as Joe Winder
 Edith Campbell Walker as Madame Blache

References

External links

 
 
 Lobby still (archived)

1917 films
1917 romantic drama films
American romantic drama films
American silent feature films
American black-and-white films
Films directed by J. Searle Dawley
Lost American films
Paramount Pictures films
1917 lost films
Lost romantic drama films
1910s American films
Silent romantic drama films
Silent American drama films
1910s English-language films
English-language romantic drama films